Hans Dürst (b. June 28, 1921 - d. June 25, 2001) is an ice hockey player for the Swiss national team. He won a bronze medal at the 1948 Winter Olympics.

References

1921 births
2001 deaths
Ice hockey players at the 1948 Winter Olympics
Medalists at the 1948 Winter Olympics
Olympic bronze medalists for Switzerland
Olympic ice hockey players of Switzerland
Olympic medalists in ice hockey
People from Davos
Sportspeople from Graubünden